

Trenbolone hexahydrobenzylcarbonate, or trenbolone cyclohexylmethylcarbonate, sold under the brand names Parabolan and Hexabolan, is a synthetic, injected anabolic–androgenic steroid (AAS) of the nandrolone group and an androgen ester – specifically, the C17β hexahydrobenzylcarbonate (cyclohexylmethylcarbonate) ester of trenbolone – which was marketed in France for medical use in humans but has since been discontinued. 

It was introduced in France in 1980 and was voluntarily discontinued by its manufacturer in 1997. The drug acts as a long-lasting prodrug of trenbolone when administered via intramuscular injection. It was used clinically at a dosage of one ampoule (76 mg, corresponding to 50 mg trenbolone base) every 10 days.

See also
 List of androgen esters § Trenbolone esters

References

Further reading

External links
 Trenbolone Hexahydrobenzylcarbonate - William Llewellyn's Anabolic.org 

Abandoned drugs
Androgen esters
Androgens and anabolic steroids
Carbonate esters
Estranes
Ketones
Prodrugs
Progestogens
World Anti-Doping Agency prohibited substances